The Sibuyan Sea is a small sea in the Philippines that separates the Visayas from the northern Philippine island of Luzon.

It is bounded by the island of Panay to the south, Mindoro to the west, Masbate to the east, and to the north Marinduque and the Bicol Peninsula of Luzon Island.

The Sibuyan Sea is connected to the Sulu Sea via the Tablas Strait in the west, the South China Sea via the Isla Verde Passage in the northwest, and the Visayan Sea via the Jintotolo Channel in the south-east. The Romblon Islands lie within the Sibuyan Sea.

History
The sea was the site of the Battle of the Sibuyan Sea on October 24, 1944, where the Japanese battleship Musashi was sunk and other ships were damaged.

External links

 
Geography of Mimaropa
Geography of the Bicol Region
Geography of Western Visayas
Maritime Southeast Asia
Seas of the Philippines